The 2022 European Fencing Championships was a fencing competition that took place from 17 to 22 June 2022 in Antalya, Turkey.

Schedule

Medal summary

Men's events

Women's events

Medal table

Results

Men

Foil individual

Épée individual

Sabre individual

Foil team

Épée team

Sabre team

Women

Foil individual

Épée individual

Sabre individual

Foil team

Épée team

Sabre team

References

External links
Official website

European Fencing Championships
European Fencing Championships
International fencing competitions hosted by Turkey
European Fencing Championships
European Fencing Championships
Fencing
2020s in Antalya